Sørlandet is a Norwegian heritage tall ship and  one of very few full-rigged ships in the world. She is the senior of the existing Norwegian built square riggers, and for more than 50 years she held a central position in the education and training of young people. She is the second oldest of three Norwegian tall ships, the “Great Trio of Norway”, which besides her includes Statsraad Lehmkuhl and Christian Radich.

History
Construction on the Sørlandet was started in 1925 at Høivolds Mek shipyard in the city of Kristiansand on the south coast of Norway based on a £25,000 grant from ship owner O.A.T. Skjelbred. Completed on May 28, 1927, she measured 210 feet in length and 577 gross tons. She was given the name Sørlandet after the Norwegian region from where she originates.

Maiden voyage 
On her maiden voyage to Oslo in 1927, Sørlandet was inspected by King Haakon and Crown Prince Olav. Later in the same year, she set sail for London with 90 young trainees on board

Training vessel: Sørlandet’s Seilende Skoleskibs Institution 
The original intention behind mr. Skjelbreds grant was the establishment of a training institution called Sørlandets Seilende Skoleskibs Institution for young sailors, and with it the construction of a fully rigged tall ship with a steel hull that could house 80 cadets and their officers. As part of “Sørlandet’s Seilende Skoleskibs Institution,” the Sørlandet played a vital role in the education of young seamen from the southern region of Norway. The young men who received their training onboard disembarques as seamen and went in to service in the Norwegian Merchant Marine or in the Royal Navy.

World Exhibit 1933 
She sailed to Chicago to take part in the World Fair in 1933. Being the first Norwegian training ship to cross the Atlantic Ocean, she actually served as the Norwegian pavilion during the exhibition "Century of Progress".

World War II 
The ship was in continuous service as a training vessel for the Norwegian Merchant Marine until 1939, when World War II started. The same year, she was chartered by the Royal Norwegian Navy and used as a depot ship in the naval port of Horten where the Germans seized her in April 1940. She was damaged during the war and served as an accommodation vessel for German submariners. At the end of the war she was in a degrading condition. She was restored and ready to sail in 1948.

In 1958 she was equipped with an engine, as one of the last European tall ships.

The 1970s 
In 1974 she was no longer used as a public training vessel and was sold to ship owner Jan Staubo. She was registered in Arendal and laid up at anchor in Kilsund for three years. In 1977 she was again bought by Skjelbreds Rederi A/S and presented as a gift to the city of Kristiansand.  She was in great need for repairs, and through governmental and municipal funds, plus extensive voluntary labour and personal donations, she was completely restored.

The 1980s 
After the repairs of the late 1970s, she was again back in service in July 1980. Some 300 trainees from 10 different nations took part in her international friendship cruises that year. Most of the foreign trainees came from the UK and USA. Both young women and men were that time on accepted.

In 1981 a foundation was established; "Stiftelsen Fullriggeren Sørlandet" has been the owner and operator of the vessel since. From 1980 to 1983 Sørlandet was the only operating Norwegian sail training ship, and the first open to men and women of all ages and nationalities.

Since 1982 she has made several Atlantic crossings, visiting ports in the US and Canada and in the Caribbean. In all these years she has carried out a series of summer cruises in the North  and Baltic Sea and visited ports on the European  continent. She was also features in an American film shoot for Shearson American express.
In 1982, Sørlandet hosted the exhibition "Women of the Coast" whilst visiting some 60 seaside destinations along Norwegian shoreline, sailing as far north as Kirkenes. A total of 83,000 people visited Sørlandet during this tour. In 1986 she once again crossed the Atlantic to take part in the 100th Anniversary of the Statue of Liberty in New York City. From 1986 to 1988 about 500 cadets from the Royal Norwegian Navy got their first life-at-sea experience through six-week courses, sailing and training aboard Sørlandet.

The 1990s 
In the latter half of the 1990s she was affiliated with the Royal Norwegian Navy, Norwegian Ship Owners' Association and the local public employment office with which she offered six-week courses in sailing and seamanship to bolster the recruitment of young seafarers.

The 2010s 

From 2010 to 2014, Sørlandet hosted the Canadian school West Island College International for its program, "Class Afloat"; it offered high school and university courses in addition to sail training on board. The foundation established its own high school, A+ World Academy, the following year.

Restorations 
In keeping with International Maritime Organization (IMO) rules of the 1969 convention that dictate the measurement of vessels of her class, Sørlandet is now 499 gross tons. She is well equipped with air-conditioning but is otherwise in her original condition. The main engine is of 560 HP. In 1980, Sørlandet went through a full restoration. She had extensive repairs in 1988 and again from 2003 to 2007. In the summer of 2012, Sørlandet spent four months in dry-dock at Tuzla, Istanbul, for a major restoration project which included the replacement of many of her riveted steel hull plates, support systems and a complete rebuild of the main ‘Banjer’ area, where students sleep and attend classes. 
She currently holds class *1A1 E0 in  Det Norske Veritas and a worldwide trading certificate for carrying trainees.

High School (A+ World Academy)
In 2015 the Foundation established its own boarding high school, A+ World Academy. The school is a university preparatory secondary school, and classes are taught onboard while the Ship sails to different locations around the world. The school has a capacity of 60-62 students in grades 11 and 12.

In the first two years of the school, they undertook a circumnavigation. The school year started in Kristiansand, Norway in August 2015 and sailed to Hong Kong via Portugal, Morocco, Canary Islands, Cape Verde, Tobago, Curaçao, Colombia, Panama, Galapagos, Easter Island, Tahiti, New Caledonia, Fiji, Indonesia and Singapore. The School year ended in June 2016.  The second school year started in Hong Kong August 2016 and sailed to Kristiansand, Norway via Vietnam, Brunei, Indonesia, Christmas Island, Sri Lanka, Maldives, Mauritius, South Africa, Namibia, Saint Helena, Brazil, Dominica, Puerto Rico, USA, Azores, France and the Netherlands.

In the school year 2017/2018 the students are sailing from Kristiansand, Norway to Kristiansand, Norway via the Mediterranean and the Caribbean. 
The foundation oversees the A+ World Academy from its offices in Kristiansand.

Curriculum 
Students follow an academic program based on Advanced Placement courses and may study subjects such as mathematics, calculus, physics, chemistry, biology, English, Spanish, politics, economics and history.

Life at the school 
Students at the school take an active part in the day-to-day operation of the Ship. They take day- and night watches that include cleaning, maintenance, sail manoeuvring, helming, lookout, galley and safety rounds.

Participation in Regattas 
The Sørlandet has participated in several Tall Ships’ Races, and her merit list is as follows:

 1956 Turbay-Lisboa (2nd place)
 1960 Oslo-Ostende (2nd place)
 1962 Turbay Bretagnekysten-Rotterdam (2nd place)	
 1964 Lisboa-Bermuda (4th place)			
 1966 Falmouth-Skagen (1st place) 
 1968 Gøteborg-"Ocean Viking"-Kristiansand (2nd place)
 1980 Skagen-Amsterdam (4th place)
 2003 Riga - Travemünde (1st place) 
 2004 Stavanger - Cuxhaven (4th place)
 2005 Newcastle Gateshead - Fredrikstad (5th place)
 2015 Belfast-Aalesund (2nd place), Kristiansand - Aalborg (1st place)
 2018 Sunderland - Esbjerg (2nd place)
 2018 Stavanger - Harlingen (3rd place)

Technical data

 Displacement: 891 tons 
 Tonnage: 499 gross tons 
 Length: 56.69m/186’ 
 Length inclusive bowsprit: 64.15m/210.5’ 
 Height of  mast head : 35m (115’) above sea level 
 Decks: 2 
 Bulkheads: 4 
 Draft: 4-45m /14.5’ 
 Beam: 8.87m/28.1’ 
 Trainee capacity: 70/sailing or 150 passengers in closed waters. 60-62 students during the school year 
 Fixed crew: 15 
 Propulsion: Deutz Diesel 564 BHP 
 Auxiliary Power: 560KW / 9 knots 
 Number of Sails: 27 
 Sail Area: 1,240m² (10,360 square feet) 
 Area of trainees’ quarter (banjer): Approx. 200m²

References

External links

 The Sorlandet Foundation
 A+ World Academy

Individual sailing vessels
Training ships
Ships built in Kristiansand
Tall ships of Norway
Full-rigged ships
Naval ships of Norway captured by Germany during World War II